Anthony Spencer may refer to:

Anthony E. Spencer II, American football player.
Anthony James Merrill Spencer, British mathematician. 
Anthony Mark Spencer, Australian outlaw biker and gangster.